The men's 4 × 100 metres relay event at the 1973 Summer Universiade was held at the Central Lenin Stadium in Moscow on 19 and 20 August.

Results

Heats

Final

References

Athletics at the 1973 Summer Universiade
1973